Brayton Park is a hamlet in Cumbria, England. It contains a small lake, notable for its fishing.

References

Hamlets in Cumbria
Allerdale